Columbia University Press is a university press based in New York City, and affiliated with Columbia University. It is currently directed by Jennifer Crewe (2014–present) and publishes titles in the humanities and sciences, including the fields of literary and cultural studies, history, social work, sociology, religion, film, and international studies.

History
Founded in May 1893, In 1933, the first four volumes of the History of the State of New York were published. In the early 1940s, revenues rises, partially thanks to the Encyclopedia and the government's purchase of 12,500 copies for use by the military. 

Columbia University Press is notable for publishing reference works, such as The Columbia Encyclopedia (1935–present), The Columbia Granger's Index to Poetry (online as The Columbia World of Poetry Online) and The Columbia Gazetteer of the World (also online) and for publishing music.

First among American university presses to publish in electronic formats, in 1998 the Press founded an online-only site, Columbia International Affairs Online (CIAO), and Columbia Earthscape (in 2009). Their books have been positively reviewed by several notable outlets, including Cleveland Review of Books.

Imprints
In 2011, Columbia University Press bought UK publisher Wallflower Press.

See also

 List of English-language book publishing companies
 List of university presses

References

External links

Official website
 Columbia Earthscape
Columbia International Affairs Online
Columbia Granger's World of Poetry
Columbia Gazetteer of the World
Finding aid to Columbia University Press records at Columbia University. Rare Book & Manuscript Library.

Press
 
University presses of the United States
Book publishing companies based in New York (state)
Publishing companies based in New York City
Publishing companies established in 1893
1893 establishments in New York (state)